Epigrapsus is genus of terrestrial crabs. The two species are omnivores.
 Epigrapsus notatus (Heller, 1865)
 Epigrapsus politus Heller, 1862

A new species, Epigrapsus villosus, is described from a cave in Guam which is distinguished from its congeners, E. notatus and E. politus in having its carapace and pereiopods covered with numerous short, stiff black setae, possessing well developed sharp epigastric cristae, pronounced anterolateral teeth, and elongate ambulatory dactyli and propodi.

References

Grapsoidea
Terrestrial crustaceans